German singer Yvonne Catterfeld has released eight studio albums, two compilation albums, two video albums and seventeen singles (including two as a featured artist). After finishing second in the inaugural season of the television competition Stimme 2000, she was signed to a recording deal with Hansa Records. In 2001, she released her first single, "Bum", under her stage name Catterfeld; the song failed to chart in any music market. Her first album, Meine Welt (2003), was preceded by four further singles, including "Niemand sonst" and "Gefühle", both of which reached the top forty of the German Albums Chart, and "Für dich" which reached number one in Austria, Germany and Switzerland and marked her commercial breakthrough. Meine Welt went Platinum in Germany and earned a Gold certification in Austria and Switzerland.

Farben meiner Welt, Catterfeld's second album, reached the top ten in Germany and earned a Gold certification from the Bundesverband Musikindustrie (BVMI). The album's lead single, "Du hast mein Herz gebrochen", was her second number one hit. Catterfeld's third album, Unterwegs, produced the top three single "Glaub an mich", and was also certified Gold by the BVMI. Her fourth record, Aura, debuted at number ten on the German Albums Chart and was less successful than its predecessors. While lead single "Erinner mich, dich zu vergessen" peaked at number six on the German Singles Chart, the follow-up, "Die Zeit ist reif", failed to reach the top 50.

Catterfeld released her fifth album, Blau im Blau, via Columbia Records in 2010. It marked a stronger shift towards the adult contemporary genre and peaked at number 37 on the German Albums Chart only, becoming her lowest-charting effort then. Lieber so, her sixth album, was released in 2013 and reached number 21 in Germany. Re-released in 2015, the album surpassed its initial peak when it climbed to number eight on the German Albums Chart following the broadcast of the second season of Sing meinen Song - Das Tauschkonzert, the German adaption of The Best Singers series. The second single, "Lieber so", reached number 23 in Germany, Catterfeld's highest-charting single in a decade.

Albums

Studio albums

Compilation albums

Singles

As lead artist

As featured artist

Other charted songs

Appearances

Music videos

References

External links
  
 

Discographies of German artists